Femina was a women's magazine that was published in South Africa from 1982 to 2010. It was marketed toward older women, and for a time it was one of the leading special-interest magazines in South Africa. In the late 2000s the magazine was affected by the Great Recession, but they were also struggling to compete in the market—partially owing to the proliferation of localised editions of international magazines. It ceased publication in March 2010 due to a decrease in both sales and advertising revenue. The April 2010 issue was the final one.

Femina was originally published by Republican Press in Durban. Associated Magazines in Cape Town acquired Femina in the late 1980s, and published their first issue in April 1988. The magazine was later published by Raphaely Kuhnel Publishing (also of Cape Town), which sold it in 2006 to Media24 (part of the media conglomerate Naspers). At the time of Feminas closure, Media24 was the predominant publisher of consumer magazines in South Africa. Its other women's magazines included Fair Lady, Sarie, and True Love.

As of 1992, editor-in-chief Jane Raphaely was also chief editor of the South African edition of Cosmopolitan. Features editor and columnist Laura Twiggs also presented a weekly chat show on the arts for Fine Music Radio in Cape Town.

See also

 List of magazines in South Africa
 List of women's magazines
 Media of South Africa

References

Further reading
 

1982 establishments in South Africa
2010 disestablishments in South Africa
Defunct magazines published in South Africa
English-language magazines published in South Africa
Magazines established in 1982
Magazines disestablished in 2010
Mass media in Cape Town
Women's magazines
History of women in South Africa